GV or gv may refer to:

Businesses and organizations 
 GV (company), formerly Google Ventures
 Aero Flight (IATA airline designator)
 Globovisión, a Venezuelan news network
 Golden Village, a movie theater chain in Singapore
 Grand Valley State University, in Michigan, USw
 General Union of Public Sector and Transport Workers, former trade union in Germany

People 
 Gianni Versace, fashion designer
 King George V of the United Kingdom
 Getúlio Vargas, former Brazilian president
 Gore Vidal, American author
 Gino Vannelli, Canadian musician

Places
 Grass Valley, California
 Greenfield Village, a part of The Henry Ford, a national landmark located in Dearborn, Michigan
 Green Valley (disambiguation)

Vehicles 
 Gulfstream V business jet
 Lockheed GV, an early designation of the KC-130F Hercules aircraft
 Suzuki Grand Vitara, an automobile
 Yugo GV, an automobile

Other uses 
 GV (nerve agent)
 Google Voice, a mobile voice application
 Manx language (ISO 639 alpha-2 code)
 Ghostview, a front end for PostScript rasteriser software for Linux/X
 Grapevine viroid, a plant disease
 GigaVolt

See also 
 G5 (disambiguation), including a list of topics named G.V, etc.